Minuscule 89 (in the Gregory-Aland numbering), ε 184 (Soden), known as Codex Gottingensis, is a Greek minuscule manuscript of the New Testament, on parchment leaves. It is dated by a colophon to the year 1289 or 1290. It was adapted for liturgical use. It has complex contents and full marginalia.

Description 

The codex contains the text of the four Gospels, on 173 leaves (size ). The text is written in one column per page, 30 lines per page (size of text ).

There is also a division according to the Ammonian Sections (Matthew 359, Mark 241 – 16:20, Luke 342, John 239), with references to the Eusebian Canons.

It contains a large number of corrections, and some unique textual variants.

Text 

The Greek text of the codex is a representative of the Byzantine text-type. Hermann von Soden classified it to the textual family Kx. Aland placed it in Category V. 
According to the Claremont Profile Method it belongs to the textual family Family Kx in Luke 1, Luke 10, and Luke 20.

It has some unique readings.

History 
According to the colophon, it was written by scribe Christophorus in 1289 or 1290. Formerly date of writing was deciphered as 1006 (Scrivener, C. R. Gregory).

In 1728 the manuscript was presented by Damianos from Sinope to Jena. In 1786 in Gotha. It was collated by A. G. Gehl in 1739, and by Matthaei.

It is currently housed in at the Göttingen State and University Library (Ms. II. A.7), at Göttingen.

See also 

 List of New Testament minuscules
 Biblical manuscript
 Textual criticism

References

Further reading 

 C. F. Matthaei, Novum Testamentum Graece et Latine (Riga, 1782). 

Greek New Testament minuscules
13th-century biblical manuscripts